Loch Gairloch is a sea loch on the North West coast of Highland, Scotland. In Scottish Gaelic it is an Geàrr Loch meaning 'the short loch'. The B8021 and B8056 run around its northern and southern shores respectively, connecting the villages of Gairloch, Charlestown, Kerrysdale, Shieldaig, Badachro, and Port Henderson. Longa Island lies at the loch's entrance.

The Loch has a number of small islands in it, Eilean Horrisdale supported a fishing community in the 19th century.

External links
 Photographs of Loch Gairloch

Gairloch
Gairloch